Jack FM is a radio network brand, licensed by Sparknet Communications, with the exception of the European Union where it is licensed by Oxis Media. It plays an adult hits format, in most cases not using DJs.

Format characteristics 
Stations using the "Jack" name are strictly licensed by SparkNet Communications. There are several terms that each station must agree to, including the use of no disc jockeys for at least the first few months of the format.  SparkNet has been protective of its format, unsuccessfully filing trademark infringement suits against Bonneville International for its use of the Jack FM service-marked slogan "Playing What We Want" and other similar phrases. For this reason, many stations airing a Jack-like format use slightly different slogans to avoid infringing on SparkNet's service marks: WBEN-FM in Philadelphia uses the tagline "Playing anything we feel like."  On WLKO "102.9 The Lake" in Charlotte, North Carolina, the tagline is "We Play Anything".  During its run as "Doug FM", WDRQ in Detroit used the line "93.1 DOUG FM - We Play...EVERYTHING!"

As the voice of "Jack," most stations in the United States use Howard Cogan and Andrew Anthony (best known as the voice of EA Sports and GEICO), while stations in Canada use Greg Beharrell.  Meanwhile all Jack FM stations in the United Kingdom used former Blake's 7 actor Paul Darrow as the voice of Jack.  In place of DJs, the Jack character makes sarcastic or ironic remarks and quips, often using self-deprecating humor.

Each September of every year, all Jack FM stations ask their listeners to visit a certain link to evaluate which songs should be played on the radio and which ones should be swapped. Changes take effect usually a few weeks to two months after the results are finalized.

History

2000–2003: Origins
One of the early originators of the Jack FM format was radio programmer Bob Perry, on a United States-based Internet radio stream in 2000. Perry named the station after a fictitious persona, "Cadillac Jack" Garrett, "a hard-living radio cowboy". The back story created by Perry for the original webstream was that Garrett, a disc jockey who had worked many "big sticks", finally got his own radio station and after years of being told what he was to play on-air was creating a station where the motto was "playing what we want".  However, according to Rogers Communications, the only thing taken, without permission, for the first Jack FM radio station, in Vancouver, British Columbia, Canada, was the name and the tagline. Pat Cardinal, one of the first Jack program directors, says that he was unaware of the type of music on the American website and that "Jack" was one of several names that were considered for the format. Rogers Communications came to an agreement with Perry for the use of the Jack FM name in Canada soon after the launch. The original webstream is still live to this day.

Jack was also inspired by the success of CHUM Limited's "Bob FM" brand on CFWM radio in Winnipeg. Program director Howard Kroeger was inspired to create Bob FM after hearing a mix tape at a friend's 40th birthday party. Other Canadian broadcasters copied the concept as well, adopting such brands as Corus Entertainment's "Dave FM" and "Joe FM". In 2003, an Ottawa station launched "Frank FM" as a one-day Halloween prank. (The prank's name was possibly also inspired by the Canadian satirical magazine Frank, and probably the New England stations known as Frank FM.)

Beginning in late 2002, several Canadian radio stations owned by Rogers Communications starting using the format. The first Jack station was Vancouver's CKLG-FM, which quickly shot to the top of the city's BBM radio ratings. The format was consequently adopted on other Rogers stations in 2002 and 2003. The format proved popular in many markets where it was introduced, although its success was not always as dramatic as it had been in Vancouver.

2004–2005: Introduction to United States and controversies
In 2004, SparkNet Communications, the owner of the Jack FM and "Playing What We Want" trademarks outside of Canada, started to license the Jack FM trademark in the United States. NRC Broadcasting's KJAC in Denver was the first U.S. station to adopt the "Jack FM" format on April 14, 2004.  (It has since switched to a public radio adult album alternative format.)

The success of Jack caused a cloning effect, with some stations using the names of famous local figures, landmarks, or symbols to promote their version of the format. These variations have included WABZ "Abe FM" in Springfield, Illinois, named for Abraham Lincoln; WBEN-FM "Ben FM" in Philadelphia, named for Benjamin Franklin; "100.5 FM Louie" in Louisville, Kentucky; "96.7 Steve FM" WLTY in Columbia, South Carolina, named after University of South Carolina football coach Steve Spurrier; WCFF "The Chief 92.5 FM" in Champaign, Illinois, named for the controversial symbol of the University of Illinois, Chief Illiniwek; WARH in St. Louis, known as "106.5 The Arch," named for the Gateway Arch, and even a body of water like "106-5 The Lake" WHLK in Cleveland, named for Lake Erie.

On July 29, 2005, Rawlco's CKCK-FM in Regina, Saskatchewan became the first non-Rogers station in Canada to directly license the Jack FM brand rather than adopting an alternate name.

On May 4, 2005 at 11 a.m., WQSR, an oldies station in Baltimore, changed its format to Jack FM. Listeners and staffers alike were surprised by the sudden change because many of the station's long-time air personalities were considered Baltimore institutions. WQSR received a large amount of negative publicity regarding the format change. Popular former WQSR personality Steve Rouse later became the morning show host at sister station 101.9 WLIF.

By far the introduction of Jack FM in New York City generated the most negative publicity of any market that switched a station to the format. On June 3, 2005, at 5:00 p.m., WCBS-FM, an oldies station in New York City, flipped to Jack FM without any prior warning. The switch to the format, with no DJs and few songs before 1980 was termed The Day the Music Died by some New Yorkers and has drawn criticism even from non-listeners of the station.  The sudden firing of DJs of historic renown such as Cousin Brucie, Ron Lundy and Harry Harrison was noted in the press. In a partial nod to this controversy, on June 14, 2005, the station announced that it would tweak the format to include a handful of 1950s and early 1960s songs as well as performers such as Frank Sinatra — elements not typical of the Jack format. However, a later update retracted this and songs from before the late 1960s were no longer played.

One prominent reaction to the format change came in the form of a derogatory comment from the city's mayor. According to the New York Post, mayor Michael Bloomberg responded to the change by declaring he would "never listen to that fucking CBS radio ever again" (the quote was censored in the newspaper). The new Jack station quickly picked up on this, using its trademark sarcasm: "Hey, Mayor Bloomberg. I heard you took a shot at us in the Post. What's with all the swearin' like a sailor? Fleet Week is over. It's just music." Initially, Arbitron ratings showed a sharp decline and while ratings did improve, they never surpassed the levels that WCBS-FM had before the format switch.

As a result, on July 6, 2007, WCBS-FM announced it would drop Jack FM and restore the station's old format on July 12 with an updated classic hits approach, a move attributed mostly to the newly appointed CBS Radio CEO Dan Mason. Three of the fired DJs and staff (Dan Taylor, Bob Shannon, and Mr. G) returned to the station, along with newsman Al Meredith (who had stayed at the station during Jack FM doing his Sunday morning public affairs show), as well as DJ Pat St. John who had previously left CBS-FM for Q104.3 about a year before the flip to Jack. Steve O'Brien, a weekend and fill-in DJ at the time of the format change, also returned in a similar capacity in 2008.  For a time, the Jack FM format WAS renamed ToNY.  It was available through WCBS-FM's HD2 subchannel, and via an internet stream at www.1011hd2.com.

On the same day that WCBS-FM flipped to Jack FM, another station owned by CBS, WJMK, an oldies station in Chicago, changed formats to Jack FM as well. The change at WJMK didn't attract as much attention as the WCBS-FM flip, but it still drew the ire of its listeners.  Just as with WCBS-FM in New York, WJMK Chicago ended the Jack FM format and reverted to classic hits in 2011.

On July 5, 2005, it was announced that Bohn & Associates Media and Wall Media formed SparkNet Communications L.P. as the exclusive international licensor and owner of the Jack FM format. SparkNet has, in turn, licensed the format to Dial Global for satellite-based syndication to stations in U.S. markets outside the 40 largest. This satellite-fed Jack became active in October 2005, and now serves many of the smaller Jack stations, such as those in Evansville, Indiana and Knoxville, Tennessee.

In late September 2005, CJAQ-FM in Toronto, announced that it would become the first DJ-free station in Canada. Pat Cardinal, general manager and program director of the station, said "The move came as a result of listener feedback.  The audience has been telling us that they want no DJs on Jack. They want more music." When it first launched, 92.5 Jack FM operated without disc jockeys in an effort to establish the "Playing What We Want" concept which was new to Toronto. DJs were introduced within weeks. In November 2005, Cardinal defended his decision in an interview with Michael Hainsworth of Report on Business Television and stated why he doesn't see commercial-free iPods and satellite radio as a threat to a non-DJ format.

In October 2005, Entravision Radio launched a Spanish-language version of the Jack format dubbed "José" with the "We Play What We Want" tagline translated into Spanish as "Toca lo que Quiere". "José" went live on six FM and AM stations in Sacramento, Stockton, and Modesto, California; Albuquerque, New Mexico; and Denver, Colorado. The "José" stations have no affiliation with Jack, SparkNet Communications, or Bob Perry.

On October 25, 2005, Infinity Broadcasting, part of CBS, announced that it would be replacing Howard Stern with Jack FM on some of its stations. Stern left terrestrial radio for Sirius Satellite Radio in late 2005.

2006–present: North American format changes, international expansion
Following the format's explosive mid-2000s growth throughout North America, Jack FM continued to expand into smaller markets across the continent. However, in many cities the novelty wore off, and in the late 2000s a number of Jack stations modified their playlists drastically or flipped to other formats outright.

In May 2006, the playlist of CJAQ-FM in Toronto evolved into a mainstream rock format. The 1980s top-40 acts such as Madonna, Duran Duran, Kim Wilde, Cyndi Lauper, and Falco were dropped in favor of an all-rock playlist, and the station's slogan changed to "Toronto's Best Rock Variety". However, In June 2009, the station flipped back to Contemporary Hits.  It returned to its former "Kiss" branding as well as adopted its current call letters. Similarly, Rawlco-owned CKCK-FM (the only non-Rogers operated Jack FM station) in Regina, Saskatchewan, adopted a classic rock direction in September, changing its slogan from the traditional "Playing What We Want" to "The Greatest Rock Of All Time" and adding announcers to its afternoon drive time show. In 2010, the tagline was changed again to "Regina's Greatest Hits".

In October 2006, the UK's first Jack FM format station won a broadcast licence for the Oxford area. 106 Jack FM Oxford started broadcasting at 1:06 PM BST on October 18, 2007. On December 2, 2009, Bristol radio station Original FM changed to Jack FM after requesting a format change with OFCOM. Two further Jack FM stations were planned on DAB digital radio from 2008 for Northamptonshire and Northeast Wales and West Cheshire but by August 2009 were a year late with no indication of an ETA. In addition the Oxfordshire Jack was to have been relayed to a wider area.
RadioToday reported The Coast was to flip to become JACK FM on July 4, 2011.

In January 2007, KAJR in California's Coachella Valley launched as a "Jack FM" affiliate in a region unable to receive the KCBS-FM signal from Los Angeles,  to the west. Jack did not last long.  By February 1, 2010, that station became soft adult contemporary-formatted KJJZ.

On October 22, 2007 WJMK in Chicago announced that radio personality Steve Dahl would be morning drive personality as of November 5, the first personality on the station since it went to the Jack format. In March 2011, WJMK dropped the Jack format in favor of classic hits as "K-Hits", featuring 1960s–1980s music. Eddie & Jobo (Ed Volkman and Joe Bohannon, former morning hosts at co-owned WBBM-FM) took over the morning show.

On June 29, 2012, it was announced that KJQN in Salt Lake City would drop the "Jack FM" format on July 16, 2012, and begin to simulcast the talk radio format of KLO.

On August 2, 2013, KFMB-FM, the Jack FM station in San Diego, began restricting access to its online stream to listeners within the city of San Diego proper. This move by program director Mike O'Reilly drew the ire of fans who live outside the city limits, including the large U.S. military community stationed locally and overseas. O'Reilly explained his rationale, citing a new Arbitron policy on how online listening is measured:

KFMB-FM achieved this effect by restricting the signal based on the IP address of the device on which a listener streamed the station. However, fans within the city of San Diego were prevented from hearing the station as well. In addition, the station charged for access to its local morning radio show on podcast in September 2013. On November 17, 2015, KFMB-FM dropped its regular Jack FM programming and began stunting with all-Christmas music as "Jack Frost"; the station launched a mainstream rock format on January 4, 2016.

On February 28, 2014, CFLT-FM in Halifax, Nova Scotia flipped formats to Jack FM becoming the latest Rogers radio station to adopt the Jack branding. Meanwhile, in February 2015, another Rogers station, CHTT-FM in Victoria, British Columbia, dropped the Jack FM format and flipped to contemporary hit radio (CHR) as "Kiss 103.1". That station, however, returned to Jack FM programming on August 15, 2019.

On December 26, 2017 at midnight, KSAJ-FM in Topeka, Kansas flipped formats from oldies to Jack FM.

The Jack FM format is distributed via satellite in the United States and internationally. Within the US, distributed originally by ABC Radio and later acquired by Dial Global (now Westwood One). In September 2019, Skyview Networks took over the US distribution rights from Westwood One. US military radio station Armed Forces Network, Afghanistan broadcasts Jack FM, having adopted the format on August 1, 2011 as a way to expand the playlist and reduce operational personnel.

Jack FM stations
Radio stations are listed here if they specifically use the Jack FM brand. Stations branded as Bob FM are listed on that article; stations using alternate brands are listed at adult hits.

Canada

Former stations

United States

Former stations

United Kingdom
In the UK, the Jack FM stations were initially licensed to OXIS Media in 2007 by Sparknet Communications in Canada. OXIS Media, who manage the brand, was set up by Clive Dickens, Ian Walker, Donnach O’Driscoll and Adrian Robinson, who had been involved with establishing Virgin Radio (now Absolute). A number of local stations were set up, with the stations being individually run by Passion Radio in Oxfordshire or Madejski Communications Limited elsewhere. By 2021, the Oxfordshire stations were run by JACK Media Oxfordshire Ltd, a division of the JACK Radio Group/JACK Media, with the others by JACK Media National Ltd, with the JACK Radio Group being ultimately run by OXIS Media Ltd. 

Current Stations:
 JACKfm (Oxford, Oxfordshire – previously 106 Jack FM)
 JACK2 Hits (launched as Jack FM 2 in Oxfordshire in August 2013) 
 JACK3 Chill (launched in May 2017 as Jack FM 3)

Discontinued:
 Union JACK Radio (broadcasting nationwide on DAB, a music station with comedy clips) (owner Jack Radio National went into administration).
 Union JACK Dance (broadcasting nationwide on DAB, a dance music station) (owner Jack Radio National went into administration).
 Union JACK Rock (broadcasting nationwide, playing only British rock music tracks) (owner Jack Radio National went into administration).
 JACK Radio (broadcasting nationwide on DAB, a music station playing only tracks by female artists, which was launched in 2018 and lasted for two years, until the slot was given over to Union JACK Dance)
 Hertfordshire – 106 Jack FM (Hertfordshire), existed from May 10, 2010, until rebranded as Bob FM Hertfordshire on March 10, 2014
 Bristol – 106 Jack FM (Bristol) launched at 6:00 am December 2, 2009, with no prior warning, following a staged on-air argument and station hijacking of Original 106.5 the previous day. Rebranded on April 1, 2015, to Sam FM
 Swindon, Wiltshire – Swindon – (previously More Radio) launched at 06:00 am on May 28, 2012, rebranded on April 1, 2015, to Sam FM
 Reading – 107 Jack FM (Berkshire) – (previously Reading 107) launched on March 2, 2014, the same day as the Reading Half Marathon, rebranded to Sam FM and The Breeze in August 2017
 Hampshire – 106 Jack FM (South Coast) – (previously The Coast 106), launched on July 4, 2011, rebranded on April 1, 2015 to Sam FM it returned to DAB as Jack FM In 2016

Austria
 Vienna – Radio 8

Russia
 Moscow – KEKC 89.9
 Saint Petersburg – KEKC 91.1

See also
 Bob FM
 BOB fm Hertfordshire
 Hank FM
 Nash FM, a peer specializing in country music
 Frank FM, a similar station

References

External links
 Sparknet Communication: JACK FM website
 SparkNet Communication website

Adult hits radio stations
Franchised radio formats
Adult hits radio stations in the United States
Triton Media Group
2000s fads and trends